River Champavathi is a small river which originates in the Eastern Ghats at an altitude of 1,200 metres above mean sea level near Andra village and flows eastwards and joins the Bay of Bengal near the village Konada. The river passes through Gajapathinagaram, Nellimarla, Saripalli, Denkada, Palem and Natavalasa of Vizianagaram district. The river has four main tributaries Eduvampula Gedda, Chitta Gedda, Pothula Gedda and Gadi Gedda. The basin has a drainage area of 1,410 square kilometres. This area is divisible into Hilly terrain (Madugula hills), Vizianagaram plains and Coastal plains.

Denkada anicut was constructed across Champavathi River in 1965–1968.

Tarakarama Thirtha Sagaram barrage was constructed to supply irrigation water to 6,690 hectares. Kumili dam with 60 million M3 live storage capacity for irrigation purpose was also built in the river basin.

Further reading
P.Jagadeshwar Rao et al.: Geo-electrical data analysis to demarcate ground water pockets and recharge zones in Champavathi River Basin, Vizianagaram district, Andhra Pradesh., J.Ind. Geophys. Union, vol 7 (2),105-113, 2003.

References

Rivers of Andhra Pradesh
Uttarandhra
Geography of Vizianagaram district
Rivers of India